Michele MacNaughton (born 18 November 1973 in Durban, KwaZulu-Natal) is a retired female field hockey player from South Africa, who represented her native country at the 2000 Summer Olympics in Sydney, Australia. There she was a member of the women's national team that finished in tenth place.

External links
 

1973 births
Living people
South African female field hockey players
Olympic field hockey players of South Africa
Field hockey players at the 1998 Commonwealth Games
Field hockey players at the 2000 Summer Olympics
Sportspeople from Durban
Commonwealth Games competitors for South Africa